Robert Bisson (10 May 1909 – 6 July 2004) was a French politician. He was a member of the National Assembly representing Calvados's 2nd constituency. He also served as Mayor of Lisieux.

References

1909 births
2004 deaths
Politicians from Paris
Mayors of places in Normandy
French pharmacists
Members of the National Assembly (France)